Clinton is a given name. It may be shortened informally to Clint. Notable people with the name include:

 Clinton Avery (born 1987), New Zealand racing cyclist
 Clinton Babbitt (1831–1907), American politician from Wisconsin
 Clinton Bennett (born 1955), British-American scholar of religions
 Clinton Black (1894–1963), American football guard
 Clinton Caldwell Boone (1872–1939), African-American minister, dentist and medical missionary
 Clinton D. Boyd (1884–1950), American attorney, judge and politician
 Clinton Browning (born 1962), Australian footballer
 Clinton Burrell (born 1956),  American football defensive back
 Clinton Campbell, American construction worker
 Clinton Cerejo, Indian music producer and singer
 Clinton Collymore, Guyana politician
 Clinton Davis (born 1965), American track athlete
 Clinton Day (1847–1916), American architect
 Clinton Eastwood, Jr. (born 1930), better known as Clint Eastwood, American film actor and director
 Clinton B. Fisk (1828–1890), American military officer and politician
 Clinton Gutherson (born 1994), Australian rugby league player
 Clinton Kane (born 1998/1999), Australian singer, songwriter, and musician
 Clinton Kelly (disambiguation), multiple people
 Clinton Morrison (born 1979), English-Irish footballer
 Clinton Portis (born 1981), American football running back
 Clinton Briggs Ripley (1840s–1920s), American architect
 Clinton Solomon (born 1983), American football wide receiver
 Clinton Warrington Stanley (1830–1884), Justice of the New Hampshire Supreme Court
 Clinton Stringfellow (1905–1959), New Zealand rugby union player
 Clinton D. Vernon (1907–1987), American politician from Utah
 Clinton Watson (1877–?), American politician from Missouri
 Clinton Richard Dawkins (born 1941), birth name of English ethologist and evolutionary biologist Richard Dawkins

For people with the surname, see Clinton. For places named Clinton, see Clinton (disambiguation).

English masculine given names